The Scriptwriter is a 2016 Turkish action-mystery film, written and directed by Hulusi Orkun Eser, starring Mehmet Asım Tuncay Aynur as a political author who, after failing to find a publisher for his new book, receives a note instructing him to, “find the scriptwriter.” The film went on nationwide general release across Turkey on .

Cast 
 Mehmet Asım Tuncay Aynur as Adem
 Mustafa Uzunyılmaz as Aydın Bey
 Dilara Büyükbayraktar as Hurel
 Halis Bayraktaroğlu as Çözücü
 Murat Parasayar
 Ebru Sarıtaş

References

External links
 

Turkish mystery films
Films set in Turkey
Films set in Istanbul
2016 films
2016 drama films